Sarah Preston (born in Middlesbrough), is an English actress and writer, who is best known for playing Karen Newburn in Holby City, Amanda Parry in EastEnders and the "Make-up Woman" whose name no-one can remember in Extras with Ricky Gervais.

Early life
Sarah Preston is the daughter of Madge Preston and Arthur Ernest Preston and has one brother and one sister.

Acting career
Sarah Preston started her career on stage at the age of five in her native Northeast of England. Some of her early acting experience was with Stockton Youth Theatre where she performed in acclaimed productions of Hair, Jesus Christ Superstar and Sweet Charity alongside Mark Benton and Marcus Bentley.

Sarah continued to be involved in many theatre and independent productions until she left for London where she trained at the Royal Academy of Dramatic Art (RADA) for three years and gained a diploma in acting.  Classmates included Andrew Lincoln and Stephen Mangan.

During her time at RADA, Sarah developed skills in stage fighting. She excelled in this, earning high qualifications and the coveted John Barton Prize. One of her first jobs after leaving RADA was in the feature film The House of Angelo.

Sarah's first major TV role was playing Karen Newburn in the BBC drama series, Holby City. She played the straight-talking, no-nonsense Ward Sister who clashes with ex-husband and cardiothoracic registrar Nick Jordan, played by Michael French. They battled throughout the first two series and their tempestuous relationship became one of the leading story-lines.

Other regular appearances include EastEnders, In Deep with Stephen Tompkinson, Steel River Blues and Extras with Ricky Gervais.

Sarah has guested in a number of other shows including Vera with Brenda Blethyn, The Last Detective alongside Peter Davison, Where The Heart Is and Doctors.

Writing
Sarah Preston founded the TV and film production company, Bamboo Media Productions Limited.

Filmography

References

External links

Alumni of RADA
Living people
People from Middlesbrough
English television actresses
English soap opera actresses
1970 births